Mercy High School, San Francisco was a Catholic all-girls college-preparatory high school located in San Francisco, California. It was a part of the Roman Catholic Archdiocese of San Francisco, and was sponsored by the Sisters of Mercy in Dublin, Ireland. The campus was located on 19th Avenue, near San Francisco State University, and included a multipurpose pavilion, which was built and dedicated to Catherine McAuley in 2001. The school permanently closed in the summer of 2020.

History

In 1855, Mother Baptist Russell and the Sisters of Mercy opened a night school for adults on Vallejo Street, San Francisco. The late auxiliary bishop of the Archdiocese of San Francisco James Thomas O'Dowd, who was then the Archdiocesan Superintendent of Schools, requested that the Sisters of Mercy provide a secondary school for the Catholic girls in the Sunset, Lakeside, and Park Merced districts. As a result, Mercy High School was opened on September 3, 1952 with a class of 199 freshmen in a partially completed building. Nearly two years later, the original building was completed in 1954.

On June 11, 1956, a class of 173 seniors received diplomas and became the first graduating class of Mercy High School. The achievement of Mercy's first graduating class placed the high school on the list of secondary schools accredited by the University of California. In 1958, Mercy High School became a charter member among schools accredited by the Western Catholic Education Association. In 1964, Mercy High School was accredited by the newly formed Secondary Commission of the Western Association of Schools and Colleges. The school was also a member of the National Catholic Educational Association.

In January 2020, the school announced that it would close at the end of the 2019–2020 school year, citing decreased enrollment figures, a shrinking endowment, and the high cost of living in San Francisco that makes affording private school tuition difficult for many families.

Academics
Mercy offered a four-year college preparatory program, which included advanced placement and honors courses in English, mathematics, science, foreign language, and history. Religious education classes were mandatory and an important component of the curriculum. The fine arts program was one of the most diverse in the Bay Area, and the athletic and speech programs  received state level recognition. Mercy's student government program  also received the highest award from the California Association of Student Councils.

Notable alumnae
 Kimberly Guilfoyle, Fox News personality; currently under subpoena in the investigation of the January 6th assault on the United States Capitol. 
Patricia Ziegler, Founder of Banana Republic
Kristina Wong, Solo theater performer, artist, actor, film maker

See also
San Francisco County high schools

Notes and references

External links
 Mercy High School website

High schools in San Francisco
Catholic secondary schools in California
Roman Catholic Archdiocese of San Francisco
Girls' schools in California
Educational institutions established in 1952
Sisters of Mercy schools
1952 establishments in California